Jean Sauvage (1455 – 7 June 1518) was the chancellor of Holy Roman Emperor Charles V.  He was also known as Jean Le Sauvage.

Sauvage was born in Lille.  He studied law at the University of Louvain.  In 1490 he was made a member of the council of Flanders and its president in 1497.  He was made chancellor of Brabant in 1509.  His rise to office occurred with the support of William de Croÿ.  In 1515 Sauvage was made Grand Chancellor of Burgundy.  In 1517 he was made Chancellor of all of Charles' realms.

Sources
Harold Livermore.  A History of Spain. New York: Grove Press, 1958. p. 208.
Peter G. Bietenholz and Thomas Brian Deutscher. Contemporaries of Erasmus: A Biographical Register of the Renasaince and Reformation. Toronto: University of Toronto Press, 2003. p. 325-326.

1455 births
1518 deaths
Chancellors (government)
French politicians
16th-century people of the Holy Roman Empire
15th-century French people
16th-century French people